Julian Woods (4 September 1887 – 11 October 1975), listed as J. A. Woods, was an Australian cricketer. He played one first-class match for Tasmania 1913/14.

See also
 List of Tasmanian representative cricketers

References

External links
 

1887 births
1975 deaths
Australian cricketers
Tasmania cricketers
Cricketers from Tasmania